Erythritol is an organic compound  a naturally-occurring, four-carbon sugar alcohol (or polyol). It is used as a food additive and sugar substitute. It is synthesized from corn using enzymes and fermentation.

Erythritol is 60–70% as sweet as sucrose (table sugar). However, erythritol is almost completely noncaloric, and does not affect blood sugar or cause tooth decay. Japanese companies pioneered the commercial development of erythritol as a sweetener in the 1990s.

Etymology
The name "erythritol" derives from the Greek word for the color red (erythros or ἐρυθρός). This is the case even though erythritol is almost always found in the form of white crystals or powder and it does not turn red as a result of chemical reactions. The name "erythritol" comes from erythrin, a closely-related compound, which turns red upon oxidation.

History
Erythritol was discovered in 1848 by Scottish chemist John Stenhouse and first isolated in 1852. In 1950 it was found in blackstrap molasses that was fermented by yeast, and it became commercialized as a sugar alcohol in the 1990s in Japan.

Occurrence
Erythritol occurs naturally in some fruit and fermented foods. It also occurs in human body fluids, such as eye lens tissue, serum, plasma, fetal fluid, and urine.

Uses, absorption, and safety

Since 1990, erythritol has had a history of safe use as a sweetener and flavor-enhancer in food and beverage products, and is approved for use  by government regulatory agencies of more than 60 countries. Beverage categories for its use are coffee and tea, liquid dietary supplements, juice blends, soft drinks, and flavored water product variations, with foods including confections, biscuits and cookies, tabletop sweeteners, and sugar-free chewing gum. The mild sweetness of erythritol allows for a volume-for-volume replacement of sugar, whereas sweeter sugar substitutes need fillers that result in a noticeably different texture in baked products.

Erythritol is absorbed rapidly into the blood, with peak amounts occurring in under two hours; the majority of an oral dose (80 to 90%) is excreted unchanged in the urine within 24 hours.

As a test of safety, scientists assessed doses for erythritol where symptoms of mild gastrointestinal upset occurred, such as nausea, excess flatus, abdominal bloating or pain, and stool frequency. At a content of 1.6% in beverages it is not considered to have a laxative effect. The upper limit of tolerance was 0.78 and 0.71 grams per kg body weight in adults and children, respectively. For safe use in children, a scientific panel for the European Food Safety Authority recommended the upper limit content per food or beverage serving was 0.6 grams per kg body weight.

Dietary and metabolic aspects

Caloric value and labeling
Nutritional labeling of erythritol in food products varies from country to country. Some countries, such as Japan and the European Union (EU), label it as zero-calorie.

Under U.S. Food and Drug Administration (FDA) labeling requirements, it has a caloric value of 0.2 calories per gram (95% less than sugar and other carbohydrates).  The FDA has not made its own determination regarding the generally recognized as safe (GRAS) status of erythritol, but has accepted the conclusion that erythritol is GRAS as submitted to it by several food manufacturers.

Human digestion
In the body, most erythritol is absorbed into the bloodstream in the small intestine, and then for the most part excreted unchanged in the urine. About 10% enters the colon.  

In small doses, erythritol does not normally cause laxative effects and gas or bloating, as are often experienced after consumption of other sugar alcohols (such as maltitol, sorbitol, xylitol, and lactitol). About 90% is absorbed before it enters the large intestine, and since erythritol is not digested by intestinal bacteria, the remaining 10% is excreted in the feces.

Large doses can cause nausea, stomach rumbling and  watery feces. In males, doses greater than 0.66 g/kg body weight, and in females, doses greater than 0.8 g/kg body weight, will cause laxation, and diarrhea in higher doses (over ). Rarely, erythritol can cause allergic hives (urticaria).

Blood sugar and insulin levels
Erythritol has no effect on blood sugar or blood insulin levels and therefore may become an effective substitute for sugar for diabetics. The glycemic index (GI) of erythritol is 0% of the GI for glucose and the insulin index (II) is 2% of the II for glucose.

Oral bacteria
Erythritol is tooth-friendly; it cannot be metabolized by oral bacteria, so it does not contribute to tooth decay. In addition, erythritol, similarly to xylitol, has antibacterial effects against streptococci bacteria, reduces dental plaque, and may be protective against tooth decay.

Manufacturing
Erythritol is manufactured using enzymatic hydrolysis of the starch from corn to generate glucose. Glucose is then fermented with yeast or another fungus to produce erythritol. A genetically engineered mutant form of Yarrowia lipolytica, a yeast, has been optimized for erythritol production by fermentation, using glycerol as a carbon source and high osmotic pressure to increase yields up to 62%.

Chemical properties

Heat of solution
Erythritol has a strong cooling effect (endothermic, or positive heat of solution) when it dissolves in water, which is often compared with the cooling effect of mint flavors. The cooling effect is present only when erythritol is not already dissolved in water, a situation that might be experienced in an erythritol-sweetened frosting, chocolate bar, chewing gum, or hard candy. The cooling effect of erythritol is very similar to that of xylitol and among the strongest cooling effects of all sugar alcohols. Erythritol has a pKa of 13.903 at 18 °C.

Biological properties

According to a 2014 study, erythritol functions as an insecticide toxic to the fruit fly Drosophila melanogaster, impairing motor ability and reducing longevity even when nutritive sugars were available.

Erythritol is preferentially used by the Brucella spp. The presence of erythritol in the placentas of goats, cattle, and pigs has been proposed as an explanation for the accumulation of Brucella bacteria found at these sites.

Synonyms
In the 19th and early 20th centuries, several synonyms were in use for erythritol: erythrol, erythrite, erythoglucin, eryglucin, erythromannite and phycite. Zerose is a tradename for erythritol.

See also 
 Erythritol tetranitrate
 Pentaerythritol
 Threitol, the diastereomer of erythritol

References

External links 
 

E-number additives
Food additives
Sugar alcohols
Sugar substitutes
Tetrols